Catch Me If You Can: Music from the Motion Picture is the original soundtrack of the 2002 film of the same name, starring Leonardo DiCaprio, Tom Hanks, Christopher Walken, Martin Sheen and Amy Adams. The original score was composed and conducted by John Williams.  The film was the twentieth collaboration between Williams and director Steven Spielberg.

The album was also produced by John Williams. It was nominated for the Academy Award for Best Original Score and the Grammy Award for Best Score Soundtrack for Visual Media.

In popular culture 
The first track of the soundtrack is featured in The Simpsons episode "Catch 'Em If You Can".

"Catch Me If You Can" was covered by Argentine actress Valentina Zenere in Disney Channel from the Argentine TV series Soy Luna.

Track listing
All music composed and conducted by John Williams unless otherwise stated.

References

External links
 Soundtracks for Catch Me If You Can at Internet Movie Database

2000s film soundtrack albums
John Williams soundtracks
2002 soundtrack albums
DreamWorks Records soundtracks